The Metropolitan District Commission Stable is a historic stable on Hillside Street in Milton, Massachusetts.

It was built in 1908 for the Metropolitan District Commission Police and the Massachusetts State Police mounted units in the Blue Hills Reservation. In 2004, the mounted units were disbanded and the stable was emptied.  Although mounted units were reinstated in 2008, there are no plans to stable them here.

The stables were added to the National Register of Historic Places on September 25, 1980.

Gallery

See also
National Register of Historic Places listings in Milton, Massachusetts

References

Milton, Massachusetts
Shingle Style architecture in Massachusetts
Government buildings completed in 1908
Government buildings on the National Register of Historic Places in Massachusetts
Buildings and structures in Norfolk County, Massachusetts
National Register of Historic Places in Milton, Massachusetts
1908 establishments in Massachusetts
Massachusetts State Police
Stables in the United States
Agricultural buildings and structures on the National Register of Historic Places in Massachusetts